Phyllonorycter etnensis is a moth of the family Gracillariidae. It is known from Sicily.

The paul feed on paul . They mine the leaves of their host paul or bore the stems.

References

etnensis
Moths of Europe
Moths described in 2006